"Chasing Hearts" is a song recorded by American electronic rock group Breathe Carolina, featuring vocals from Tyler Carter of the metalcore band Issues. It was released as the fourth single from Breathe Carolina's fourth studio album Savages, on April 15, 2014 via Fearless Records. Written by the band, it features Carter as a guest vocalist, and was produced by Ian Kirkpatrick. The music video for this song premiered on Billboard on April 15, 2014, and was directed by Jade Elher.

Background and composition
"Chasing Hearts" has been described as an electronic and R&B influenced song. The track runs at 172 BPM and is in the key of A minor. The song premiered exclusively via Alternative Press on April 7, 2014. Speaking about the song, David Schmitt stated, "Hooligans meets the romantics. We just wanted to make a song that everyone relates to." He also added, "This isn’t a new band, but it is a new sound. I grew up listening to electronic music, and I wanted to embrace that influence wholeheartedly this time around."

Music video
Billboard premiered the music video on April 15, 2014. Directed by Jade Elher, the video features Breathe Carolina venturing out to an abandoned part of town in the California desert. It’s a mixture of filming from Elher and footage caught from hand-held Go Pro cameras.

References

2014 singles
2014 songs
Electronic songs
Fearless Records singles
Breathe Carolina songs
Songs written by Ian Kirkpatrick (record producer)
Songs written by Tyler Carter
Song recordings produced by Ian Kirkpatrick (record producer)